Alexander Ambrose Davison (12 October 1886 – 26 August 1945) was an Australian rules footballer who played for the Richmond Football Club in the Victorian Football League (VFL).

Notes

External links 
		

1886 births
1945 deaths
Australian rules footballers from Melbourne
Richmond Football Club players
People from Carlton, Victoria